Brazil national volleyball team may refer to:

 Brazil men's national volleyball team
 Brazil women's national volleyball team